Caldasite is a rare uraniferous ore of zirconium found in the Poços de Caldas massif, located in the states of Minas Gerais and São Paulo, Brazil.

It is most often found as a dark gray, very dense, hard rock. It also appears as a friable brown substance.

The massif is an alkaline complex, formed by a large intrusion during the mid-Cretaceous. The ore is a result of hydrothermal alteration of the nepheline-syenitic rocks; it has also been weathered out and concentrated in paleoplacer deposits.

References

Further reading

 
 
 
 
 
 
 
 
 
 
 
 

Zirconium compounds